Akaroa was a New Zealand electorate. It was located in Banks Peninsula, Canterbury, and named after the town of the same name. One of the original 24 electorates, it existed from 1853 to 1893.

Population centres
The Akaroa electorate was named after Akaroa on Banks Peninsula. It covered the peninsula and other rural land near Christchurch. Its boundary was a straight line running due south "from the Conical Rocks midway between the eastern headland of Port Albert, and the western headland of Pigeon Bay, due south across Banks' Peninsula, meeting the sea at the western headland of Island Bay." Its only neighbour was the large, rural electorate of Christchurch Country, which covered most of Canterbury and the West Coast.

In subsequent years, the electorate's boundaries shifted slightly, retreating on the Peninsula's northern coast and expanding on its southern coast (gaining the Kaitorete Spit, between Lake Ellesmere / Te Waihora and the sea).

In the 1871 election, the bulk of Mount Herbert electorate, which covered the land around Lyttelton Harbour except for Lyttelton itself, was absorbed into Akaroa. Later, in the 1887 election, the electorate gained a spur extending almost as far west as Lincoln, but lost this again in the 1890 election. In 1890, the electorate included the town of Lyttelton.

In the 1893 election, Akaroa was merged with the portions of Ellesmere electorate that bordered the lake, with the resulting electorate retaining the name Ellesmere.

History
The electorate of Akaroa was one of the twenty-four original electorates, used in New Zealand's first general election.

The  was contested by George Armstrong and Lancelot Walker, with Armstrong ahead by just four votes (3.08%).

Alexander McGregor, William Barnett, George Armstrong, George Russell Joblin, Frederick Arthur Anson, and John Edward Thacker received 425, 145, 142, 126, 114 and 52 votes, respectively.

The  electorate was abolished for the  election and the town became part of the Akaroa electorate. Lyttelton's incumbent, John Joyce contested the election against McGregor and William Barnett. Joyce defeated McGregor by 750 to 647 votes, with Barnett coming a distant third.

Members of Parliament
Key

Election results

1890 election

April 1874 by-election

1866 election

1853 election

Notes

References 

Historical electorates of New Zealand
1853 establishments in New Zealand
1893 disestablishments in New Zealand
Akaroa
Politics of Canterbury, New Zealand